Mizugakiibacter  is a Gram-negative genus of Pseudomonadota from the family of Rhodanobacteraceae with one known species (Mizugakiibacter sediminis). Mizugakiibacter sediminis has been isolated from sediments from the Lake Mizugaki in Japan.

References

Further reading 
 

Xanthomonadales
Bacteria genera
Monotypic bacteria genera